The Red Bull Soapbox Race is a soapbox race organised at least once a year by Red Bull. During its final phase, amateur pilots challenge one another by presenting hand-made, motor-less vehicles, judged for their aesthetic, their speed and their road-holding.

Originality and extravagance play an even greater role in the competition, as each team is also rated for their showmanship and the soapboxes are often inspired by folklore, pop culture, motorsport or everyday-life themes in their creation. Some notable examples include Pokémon-based karts and playful reproductions of the Popemobile or Mr. Bean's Mini.

First held in 2000, over a hundred races have been held in multiple countries around the world ever since, usually attracting thousands of spectators and putting the primary focus on the most creative and entertaining side of the competition.

History 
The inaugural event was held in Brussels, Belgium on April 30, 2000. Races have since been held all across the globe, covering every single continent at least once, excluding Antarctica. The first race out of Europe took place on March 30, 2003, when the sixth edition ever was organized in Auckland, New Zealand: this was also the first time the competition was held in Oceania. Auckland would later host the soapbox race thrice more, in 2005, 2013 and 2015.

In 2004, the event was organized in four different locations throughout the year, including Durban, South Africa. The same location was chosen one year later, and the country would host the competition twice more, in 2006 (in Johannesburg) and 2010 (in Soweto): South Africa still represents the only African nation to have held the soapbox race.

The competition first arrived in the United States in 2006, when a new edition was held in St. Louis, Missouri: ever since, a total number of seventeen races have taken place throughout the country.

In 2007, the race spread to the Caribbean for the first time, as Jamaica hosted a new edition. Instead, South America first got to know the event better the following year, when two different editions were held in Brazil: the first one took place in Fortaleza on June 8, while the second one was organized in Porto Alegre on September 21.

The circle was completed between 2012 and 2013, with three subsequent editions being organized in the same number of Asian countries: China (although the event was hosted in Hong Kong), India and Oman.

Currently, 2017 has featured the largest amount of races, with eleven different races taking place between Europe, North America and Asia throughout the year.

2020 actually featured just one edition of the race, held in Santiago (the third time overall, as the Chilean capital city had already hosted the event in 2011 and 2016) on March 14. The second one was set to be held in Florence, Italy on June 7, but was later cancelled due to the emergency measures taken in response to the COVID-19 pandemic in the country. Still, the seventy selected projects were rated and awarded by the deputed jury in October of the same year.

Rules 

The vehicles must have steering and braking capability. Teams are judged on both the time taken to complete the course, as well as creativity of their design and the showmanship of a performance at the start of the race, meaning the team with the fastest time is not necessarily the winner.

Tracks 
In the 2013 London race, one team reached a speed of over 50 kilometers per hour as they completed the 430 metre course in 33 seconds. The Cork 2004 course down St. Patrick's Hill was the steepest ever used at the time.

Notable participants 

On May 16, 2015, the Dutch racing driver Max Verstappen, a Formula One pilot for the Red Bull racing team himself, opened the race in Valkenburg, Netherlands, driving a soapbox that resembled his own STR10 racing car.

Races

Prizes 
The winners of events receive a trophy and various special prizes, such as a trip to the Macau Formula 3 Grand Prix to meet Carlos Sainz (Hong Kong 2012), a tour of the Red Bull Racing Factory, including a high performance track day (London 2013). In the 2007 Providence race, the three highest scoring teams received trips. A People's Choice Award is given to the audience's favorite team. Prize money is also awarded for the best charity entrant - 5,000 Euros for the 2004 Cork race.

Reception 
In 2007, the New York Times contrasted the creative nature of the Red Bull series adult based teams, with the traditional American view of youth based Soap Box Derby, where design options were limited. Reviewing the 2008 Belfast race, the News Letter related that it was "difficult to describe the quality of the lunacy on display" Reviewing the 2011 Los Angeles event, the Huffington Post described it as a piece of rare wholesome fun so rare in modern-day big cities, and through the various designs and teams it showed creativity and the human spirit, with flashes of great ingenuity and engineering, and capturing the zeitgeist. Previewing the 2015 London event, the Evening Standard described the series as a global phenomenon. Reviewing the 2015 Montreal event, the Montreal Gazette said the races were not for the faint hearted, even for spectators.

References

External links 
 Official site
 https://www.youtube.com/watch?v=6F32ZGeXQZw

Soapbox Race